Ianthella is a genus of sponges belonging to the family Ianthellidae. The species of this genus are found in Australia, Africa and Central America.

Species
There are nine recognized species:
Ianthella aerophoba 
Ianthella basta 
Ianthella concentrica 
Ianthella flabelliformis 
Ianthella homei 
Ianthella labyrinthus 
Ianthella quadrangulata 
Ianthella reticulata 
Ianthella topsenti

References

Verongimorpha
Sponge genera
Taxa named by John Edward Gray